Vahur Glaase (born 21 September 1960 Tallinn) is an Estonian politician. He was a member of VIII Riigikogu.

References

Living people
1960 births
People's Union of Estonia politicians
Members of the Riigikogu, 1995–1999
Politicians from Tallinn
Members of the Riigikogu, 1999–2003